Canniprene (C21H26O4) is an isoprenylated bibenzyl found in the fan leaves of Cannabis sativa. Canniprene can be vaporized and therefore potentially inhaled from cannabis.

References 

Dihydrostilbenoids